Hieronymus Megiser (c.1554 in Stuttgart – 1618 or 1619 in Linz, Austria) was a German polymath, linguist and historian.

Career
From 1571 he studied at the University of Tübingen, and was a favourite student of the humanist and philologist Nicodemus Frischlin. In 1577 he graduated there with a master's degree. In 1581 he moved as a private tutor to Ljubljana (Laibach). From 1582 he studied jurisprudence in Padua and was then active as a private tutor of young noblemen from Croatia and Styria. In 1588/89 he travelled to Italy and Malta, and in 1591 to North Germany, the Netherlands and England.
 
In 1590/91 he was granted the title of "Ordinarius Historiographus" by Archduke Charles in Graz. In 1592, still in Graz, he published his Dictionarium quatuor linguarum, the first multilingual dictionary of Slovene. He made the acquaintance of the young Johannes Kepler, and remained in learned correspondence with him. After further travels he settled in Frankfurt am Main and married the daughter of the printer Johann Spiess. From 1593 until 1601 he was the Rector of the Protestant Collegium sapientiae et pietatis in Klagenfurt, Carinthia. 

After returning to Frankfurt am Main he became Professor of History at the University of Leipzig. From 1610 the interest of the Upper Austrian dignitaries in history was so great that they required a historian to head up the provincial library, in a similar way to a court historian. Megiser was selected for this role in 1615, and was commissioned to write a chronicle of the province.
 
In 1612 he published Annales Carinthiae or Chronica des Loeblichen Ertzhertzogthumbs Khaerndten, which he signed as his own work, although it was mainly written by Carinthian pastor Michael Gothard Christalnick and only edited by Megiser on the request of the Carinthian Estates.

Further reading
 Hubert Bergmann: "Beobachtungen zu Megisers 'Dictionarium quatuor linguarum' von 1592 bzw. 1744 aus Sicht der bairischen Dialektlexikografie", in: Fokus Dialekt. Analysieren – Dokumentieren – Kommunizieren. Festschrift für Ingeborg Geyer zum 60. Geburtstag. Hubert Bergmann, Manfred Michael Glauninger, Eveline Wandl-Vogt and Stefan Winterstein editors. Hildesheim 2010. 
 Max Doblinger: "Hieronymus Megisers Leben und Werke", in: Mitteilungen des Instituts für Österreichische Geschichtsforschung, Bd. XXVI, Innsbruck 1905, pp. 431-478.
 Anton Kreuzer: „Zweimal Kärnten“, Klagenfurt 1970, pp. 24-27, Kreuzer-Buch Eigenverlag, Einigkeitsstraße 3, 9020 Klagenfurt.
 Josef Pauser, Martin Scheutz and Thomas Winkelbauer (eds.): Quellenkunde der Habsburgermonarchie (16.–18. Jahrhundert). Ein exemplarisches Handbuch(= Mitteilungen des Instituts für Österreichische Geschichtsforschung, Ergänzungsband 44). Sonderdruck. Wien, München 2004.
 Oskar Sakrausky: Protestantische Sprachschöpfung bei den Slowenen im 16. Jahrhundert: Einführung zur lateinischen Vorrede der Grammatik des Adam Bohorič und den lateinischen Disticha des Wörterbuches in vier Sprachen von Hieronimus Megiser. In: Jahrbuch für die Geschichte des Protestantismus in Österreich, Bd. 114, 1998, pp. 5-24.
 Heidi Stein: Der türkische Transkriptionstext des Hieronymus Megiser. Ein Beitrag zur Sprachgeschichte des Osmanisch-Türkischen. Phil. Diss. Leipzig 1975 (Masch. Ms.).
 Arno Strohmeyer: "„Vom Licht des Krieges zur Geburt der Geschichte“. Die Geschichtskultur der österreichischen Stände im Werden der Habsburgermonarchie (1550–1650)". In: Anzeiger der Österreichischen Akademie der Wissenschaften, philosophisch-historische Klasse, Jg. 137, Wien 2002, pp. 147–165.
 Arno Strohmeyer: „Höfische“ und „ständische“ Geschichtsschreibung als historiographiegeschichtliche Kategorien: Die Erbländer im 16. und 17. Jahrhundert". In: ÖGL, Jg. 46, Wien 2002, pp. 202–218.

References

External links

 Hieronymus Megiser at Deutsche Biographie (ADB & NDB)

Linguists from Austria
16th-century Austrian historians
1550s births
1610s deaths
Writers from Stuttgart
University of Tübingen alumni
University of Padua alumni
Academic staff of Leipzig University
17th-century Austrian historians